"Boom Kah" is a song by Finnish singer Robin featuring Mikael Gabriel and Uniikki. Released on 30 August 2013, the song is the first single from Robin's third studio album Boom Kah. The song peaked at number four on the Finnish Singles Chart.

Chart performance

References

2013 singles
Robin (singer) songs
Finnish-language songs
2013 songs